The 1972 Xavier Musketeers football team was an American football team that represented Xavier University as an independent during the 1972 NCAA University Division football season. In their first year under head coach Tom Cecchini, the team compiled a 2–8 record.

Schedule

References

Xavier
Xavier Musketeers football seasons
Xavier Musketeers football